The Música + Alma + Sexo World Tour (also known as the M.A.S. Tour) was the eighth concert tour by Puerto Rican singer-songwriter Ricky Martin. The tour supported his ninth studio album, Música + Alma + Sexo (2011). It began with a series of concerts in Puerto Rico and North America, with international dates later in the year. The tour was his first in four years, the previous being the 2007 Black and White Tour. On the Pollstar Top 50 Worldwide Tours of the first half of 2011, Ricky Martin ranked at number 42. His tour grossed $17.7, with 37 shows and 246,141 total tickets. After visiting 28 countries throughout North America, Europe and Latin America, Ricky Martin formally ended his tour on November 12, 2011 in his homeland, Puerto Rico, at the Coliseo de Puerto Rico José Miguel Agrelot. The tour was planned to close on November 19, 2011 in Santo Domingo, however it got cancelled

Background
The tour was announced on December 19, 2010, with the first show taking place in Martin's homeland of Puerto Rico. This was the second time that Martin began a world tour in the island, the first being the Black and White Tour. Martin has expressed gratitude towards his Puerto Rican fans, promising an "amazing show for everyone to enjoy." North American tour dates were announced in January 2011. Martin's wardrobe was designed exclusively by Giorgio Armani. The outfits have different themes. "I feel completely honored and excited to be working with him (Armani) again," said Martin. Armani had previously designed Martin's wardrobe for the 1998 Vuelve Tour and the 1999–2000 Livin' la Vida Loca Tour.

Setlist
The following songs were performed during the concert held at the Mohegan Sun Arena, in Uncasville, Connecticut. It does not represent all songs performed on tour.
Act 1: Rock goes Pop
"Será Será"
"Dime Que Me Quieres"
"It's Alright"
"Que Día Es Hoy"
"Vuelve"
Act 2: Cabaret
"Livin' la Vida Loca"
"She Bangs"
"Shake Your Bon-Bon"
"Loaded"
"Basta Ya"
Act 3: Mediterráneo
"María"
"Tu Recuerdo"
"El Amor de Mi Vida" / "Fuego Contra Fuego" / "Te Extraño, Te Olvido, Te Amo"
"Frío"
"I Am" (contains elements of  "I Don't Care")
Act 4: Afrobeat
"Más"
"Lola, Lola"
"La Bomba"
"Pégate" (contains elements of "Por Arriba, Por Abajo")
"The Cup of Life"
Encore
"The Best Thing About Me Is You"

Tour dates

Festivals and other miscellaneous performances
Uluslararası Bursa Festivali
Luglio Suona Bene
Verona Jazz
Montreux Jazz Festival
Arena of Pop
Pori Jazz

Box office score data

Crew
Directed for the Stage by: Dago Gonzales
Production & Lighting Design: Baz Halpin, Chris Nyfield (Silent House)
Production Manager: Rich Barr
Creative Producer: Veikko Fuhrmann
Photography: Baz Halpin, Djeneba Aduayom
Dancers: Melissa Chiz, Tatiana Delgado, Christopher Granitz, Gerard Heintz, Erika Marosi, Amy Miles, Conrad Pratt (Dance Captain), Sherhan Rodriguez
Source:

References

External links

Ricky Martin concert tours
2011 concert tours